Sandra Zampa (born 16 May 1956) is an Italian politician who sat in the Chamber of Deputies for the Democratic Party. She has been an Undersecretary at the Ministry of Health from September 2019 to February 2021 in the midst of the COVID-19 pandemic, as part of the Conte II cabinet.

Political career 
Zampa has been responsible for the response to the COVID-19 pandemic in Italy. She announced the purchase of many new ventilators as well as the importing of one and a half million masks from South Africa.

References

External links 
Files about her parliamentary activities (in Italian): XVI, XVII, XIX legislature

Living people
1956 births
University of Bologna alumni
21st-century Italian women politicians
Deputies of Legislature XVI of Italy
Deputies of Legislature XVII of Italy
Democratic Party (Italy) politicians
Politicians of Emilia-Romagna
Women members of the Chamber of Deputies (Italy)